Radnevo is a town in southern Bulgaria, part of Stara Zagora Province, located in the eastern Upper Thracian Lowlands. It is the administrative centre of the homonymous Radnevo Municipality. As of December 2009, the town has a population of 13,384 inhabitants.

The far east corner of Radnevo is the location of the Maritsa Iztok-2 power station. This power station was ranked as the industrial facility that is causing the highest damage costs to health and the environment in Bulgaria and the entire European Union.

Notable natives include Bulgarian Agrarian National Union politician Dimitar Dragiev (1869–1943), poet Geo Milev (1895–1925), Bulgarian international footballer Andrey Zhelyazkov (b. 1952).

Honour
Radnevo Peak on Livingston Island in the South Shetland Islands, Antarctica is named after Radnevo.

References 

Towns in Bulgaria
Populated places in Stara Zagora Province